Bodil Aileen Niska (born 21 August 1954 in Vadsø, Norway) is a Norwegian jazz saxophonist known for her recordings of  jazz standards.

Career 
Raised in Hammerfest ,she was taught music by her father, the accordion player Aksel Niska, and studied under the guidance of Kjell Bartholdsen, and ran the jazz club "Montenegro" (1979–89). After moving southward in Norway in 1990, Niska collaborated within the trio "Girl Talk" from 1992, the other members being Tine Asmundsen (double bass) and Elizabeth Walker. They recorded the album Talkin' Jazz (1996). She formed the Bodil Niska Quartet, including Per Husby (piano), Stig Hvalryg (bass) and Roger Johansen (drums), at the Oslo Jazz Festival in 2005. She is also known for her collaboration with Pete Brown Trio, including Scott Hamilton and Harry Allen.

Niska has established the "Bare Jazz" store in Oslo, and a record label by the same name. For her work she received "Sildajazzprisen" in 2005 and the Oslo Jazz Festival award "Ella-prisen" in 2009.

Honors 
2005:"Sildajazzprisen" at the Jazz Festival in Haugesund
2009: "Nordprofil-prisen
2009: "Ella-prisen at Oslo Jazzfestival

Discography

Solo albums 
2000: First Song (Hot Club Records), including Egil Kapstad, Bjørn Alterhaug and Pelle Hultén (contributions by Aksel Niska)
2004: Blue (Bare Jazz Records), with Kapstad, Alterhaug, Hulten & Paul Wagnberg
2008: Night Time (Bare Jazz Records), with Claes Crona Trio & Staffan William-Olsson

Collaborative works 
1993: Noe Som Har Hendt (Kirkelig Kulturverksted), with "Dronning Mauds Land»
1996: Talkin' Jazz (Hot Club Records), within the trio "Girl Talk»
2006: Sakte Sanger (Park Grammofon), with Anne Lande & Per Husby

References

External links 

Bodil Niska  at Barejazz.no

1954 births
Living people
Norwegian jazz saxophonists
Norwegian jazz composers
Musicians from Hammerfest
21st-century saxophonists
People from Vadsø
Women jazz saxophonists